Acetoxolutamide is a nonsteroidal androgen and selective androgen receptor modulator (SARM) which was described in 2000 and was never developed or marketed for medical use. It was derived from structural modification of the nonsteroidal antiandrogen bicalutamide and the nonsteroidal SARM acetothiolutamide. Acetoxolutamide shows greatly improved pharmacokinetic properties and anabolic and androgenic potency relative to acetothiolutamide in animals. It is the (2R) enantiomer of andarine (also known as acetamidoxolutamide or androxolutamide).

References

Abandoned drugs
Acetamides
Selective androgen receptor modulators
Trifluoromethyl compounds
Nitro compounds
Tertiary alcohols